Alon Greenfeld (born 17 April 1964 in New York City) is an Israeli chess grandmaster and trainer.

His peak rating is 2610, achieved in the FIDE rating list of January 1994.

In 1982, he finished runner-up in the European Junior Chess Championship. Two years later, Greenfeld won the Israeli national championship. His best individual achievement is the victory of the Komerční banka Cup, a category 14 round-robin tournament at the Trimex Open 1993 in Pardubice.

His most famous pupil has been Emil Sutovsky. He travels regularly to India, and works with a number of promising young Indian players e.g., Vidit Gujarathi, who he has been training since 2004. Asked what his best game was Greenfeld unhesitatingly replied: "My game against G.M. Boyce at Jersey 2004" 

Alon Greenfeld played for Israel in five Chess Olympiads.
 In 1982, at first reserve board in the 25th Chess Olympiad in Lucerne (+3 −1 =3);
 In 1984, at second board in the 26th Chess Olympiad in Thessaloniki (+6 −1 =6);
 In 1988, at first board in the 28th Chess Olympiad in Thessaloniki (+4 −5 =4);
 In 1990, at fourth board in the 29th Chess Olympiad in Novi Sad (+5 −2 =4);
 In 1994, at fourth board in the 31st Chess Olympiad in Moscow (+4 −2 =3).

Greenfeld was awarded the titles of International Master (IM) in 1983 and Grandmaster (GM) in 1989.

References

External links

Alon Greenfeld chess games at 365Chess.com

1964 births
Living people
Chess grandmasters
Chess coaches
Israeli chess players
20th-century American Jews
Jewish chess players
Chess Olympiad competitors
Sportspeople from New York City
21st-century American Jews